Varsham Boranyan (born on 4 March 1988) is an Armenian Greco-Roman wrestler who won the gold medal at 2016 European Wrestling Championships.

References

External links 
 Varsham Boranyan is the new champion of Europe | Greko-Roman Wrestling
 GOLD GR - 71 kg: V. BORANYAN (ARM) df. A. MAKSIMOVIC (SRB), 3-0
 

1988 births
Living people
Armenian male sport wrestlers
European Wrestling Championships medalists
21st-century Armenian people